Kap Dalton is a cape in Østgrønland, eastern Greenland. A small bay on Kap Dalton's north side allows for anchorage. On west part of this bay, still remains the rets of Amdrup settlement in 1900

References

Peninsulas of Greenland